Simon John Blackwell (born 27 May 1966) is an English comedy writer and producer. He is best known for his work on The Thick of It, In The Loop and Veep, and for his collaborations with Jesse Armstrong and Sam Bain on Peep Show, Four Lions and The Old Guys. Blackwell is the creator of the comedy series Back, starring David Mitchell and Robert Webb, as well as Breeders, starring Martin Freeman and Daisy Haggard.

Career
After graduating from Churchill College, Cambridge as a mature student and then working as a sub-editor for magazines, Blackwell started writing TV comedy in 1999 on shows such as Have I Got News For You, The Kumars at No. 42, Alastair McGowan's Big Impression and The Armstrong and Miller Show, for which he created the duo's street-talking RAF pilot characters. He first worked with Armando Iannucci in 2003 on the topical Channel 4 show Gash. He went on to write on all four series of Iannucci's political sitcom The Thick of It and co-wrote its spin-off film In The Loop, which was nominated for an Oscar for Best Adapted Screenplay.

Other work with Iannucci includes 2004: The Stupid Version and Time Trumpet.

The two collaborated again on the HBO comedy Veep, with Blackwell co-writing the pilot episode and serving as writer and executive producer on the subsequent four seasons, for which he won two Primetime Emmy Awards.

Blackwell wrote for Chris Morris's 2010 black comedy film Four Lions, alongside Jesse Armstrong and Sam Bain. He had previously collaborated with them on the Channel 4 sitcom Peep Show and BBC One's The Old Guys.

In 2016, Blackwell created the sitcom Back starring David Mitchell and Robert Webb. It premiered on Channel 4 on 6 September 2017.

In 2020, Blackwell created the dramedy Breeders, starring Martin Freeman and Daisy Haggard. The series premiered on the American cable network FX on 2 March 2020, and on Sky One on 12 March 2020.

Filmography

Television

Film

References

External links
 
 

1966 births
British television writers
English comedy writers
English screenwriters
English male screenwriters
English television writers
Writers from London
British male television writers
Living people
People from Battersea
Alumni of Churchill College, Cambridge